The 2013 Campeonato Piauiense de Futebol was the 73rd edition of the Piauí's top professional football league. The competition began on January 26, and ended on May 19. Parnahyba won the championship by the 5th time.

Format
On the first stage, all teams play against each other in a double round-robin. The best four teams advances to the semifinals. The semifinals and the finals are played in two-legged ties.

Qualifications
The champion qualifies to the Série D and Copa do Brasil.

Participating teams

First stage

Standings

Results

Final stage

Semifinals

First leg

Second leg

Finals

Parnahyba Sport Club is the champion of the 2013 Campeonato Piauiense.

References

Piauiense
Campeonato Piauiense